Calceolaria stricta is a species of plant in the Calceolariaceae family. It is endemic to Ecuador.

References

Endemic flora of Ecuador
stricta
Vulnerable plants
Taxonomy articles created by Polbot